María de los Ángeles Cano Márquez (12 August 1887 – 26 April 1967) was a Colombian poet and writer who was the country's first female political leader.
Called the "Flor del trabajo" (Labor flower), Cano led the struggle for basic civil rights and for the rights of salaried workers. She was the leader of several workers' strikes and a co-founder of the Socialist Revolutionary Party.

Early life and education
Cano was born on 12 August 1887 in Medellín in Antioquia Department to Don Rodolfo Cano and Dona Amelia Márquez, educated and influential Radical Liberals. She had two sisters. She was educated in secular rather than Catholic schools. Colombian women were not at the time permitted to attend University. Both of Cano's parents died when she was 23.

Career
Cano participated in a literary circle and magazine called Cyrano with other intellectuals from Medellín. By 1922, she was working for the newspaper El correo liberal ("The Liberal Mail"). Her writing and poetry had an "intimate and erotic" tone. In March 1924, she expressed a desire to open a free public library, inviting newspapers and bookstores to donate materials, and by May a municipal library had begun.

Cano was involved in political circles influenced by the Bolshevik Revolution and became a socialist. She abandoned writing purely for artistic reasons and became a social activist and revolutionary leader. As well as providing food and clothing to people in need, she did readings at the library to raise the cultural awareness of workers. She visited factories and began denouncing the unfair working conditions and organising strikes.

On 1 May 1925, Colombia's Labor Day,  Cano was given the name the "Labor flower of Medellín", an honorific title usually given to charity workers that she used as a political platform. She became a symbol for rebellious women, and "parents in Antioquia sought to prevent their daughters from becoming mariacanos."

From 1925–1927, Cano made seven tours of the country. Her first rallies were held at the  mines of Sevilla and Remedios. She was instrumental in the liberation of Raúl Eduardo Mahecha. In 1926, the National Workers Confederation gave her the responsibility of organising Antioquia's representation at the Third Labor Congress. At the congress she interviewed the government secretary, calling for the release of political prisoners Vicente Adame and Manuel Quintín Lame, making her the first women to occupy a leadership position in a political organisation in Colombia. She was declared the "Labor flower of Colombia". She was instrumental in the founding of the Socialist Revolutionary Party in 1926. She spoke out against the death penalty alongside  former President Carlos Eugenio Restrepo.

Cano was arrested several times and placed under police surveillance. Several of her rallies were broken  up by police in riot gear. She spoke out against social injustice amongst the elite, the government's repression of opposition and the practices of US companies.

Cano co-founded the party newspaper, La justicia and wrote for numerous other publications. In 1928, she led the fight against the government's ley heroica, a law designed to suppress communism. She also supported Nicaraguan leader Augusto César Sandino against the invasion of US troops. In November 1928, a strike of banana plantation workers culminated in a massacre of workers at a demonstration at Ciénaga, Magdalena on 6 December. Although Cano was not present, she was charged with conspiracy and imprisoned. She became politically isolated after an ideological split in the socialist ranks and was unsuccessful in a 1934 attempt at returning to politics.

Cano left Bogotá and worked for the Antioquia State Press in Medellín. The Medellín Women's Alliance recognised her contributions in 1945, and in 1960 she was appointed as speaker for the Democratic Organization of Antioquia Women.

Personal life
Cano lived with communist writer and orator Ignacio Torres Giraldo.

Death and legacy
Cano died in Medellín on 26 April 1967.

In 1990, Camila Loboguerrero directed a Colombian film called Maria Cano, starring Maria Eugenia Dávila as Cano filmed in Salamina-Caldas. In Antioquia, there is a street, two schools and a University named after Cano. In 1991, the labor organization The Flor del Trabajo Association was created in Funza. Its name was changed on 23 March 2013 to the Association Maria Cano.

References

1887 births
1967 deaths
People from Medellín
Colombian women writers
Colombian socialists
Colombian political writers
20th-century Colombian women politicians
20th-century Colombian politicians
Socialist feminists
Colombian women's rights activists
Colombian human rights activists
Women human rights activists